is a Japanese singer. She was represented with Space Craft. She previously worked with the stage name Cherie.

Biography
By the time she was six, Uura moved from Kagoshima Prefecture to Chiba Prefecture. She spent her high school and college years in Kansai. Uura debuted her music career with the single "Tears: Namida wa Misetakunai" in the 27 December 2006. In the 14 March 2007 she released the single "Sha la la –Ayakashi Night–", produced by B'z member Koshi Inaba, which became a hit. Uura became the first Being artist to carry out promotional activities in Myspace. In the 1 February 2011 she moved to Universal Music Japan and changed her name to Cherie. She changed to her original name later in the 30 August 2012.

Discography

As Saeka Uura

CD singles

Limited singles

Full albums

Mini-albums

Participation works

Music recordings

As Cherie

CD singles

Full albums

Films

Stage

References

Japanese women rock singers
1989 births
Living people
Being Inc. artists
Musicians from Chiba Prefecture
Musicians from Kagoshima Prefecture
21st-century Japanese singers
21st-century Japanese women singers